Metohija is a village in the municipality of Ston, Dubrovnik-Neretva County, Croatia. It is connected by the D414 highway.

References

Populated places in Dubrovnik-Neretva County